The Swift Diamond River is a  river in northern New Hampshire in the United States. It is a tributary of the Dead Diamond River, located in the Androscoggin River watershed.

The Swift Diamond River rises in the town of Stewartstown, New Hampshire, atop Dead Water Ridge within Coleman State Park. The stream flows east into Little Diamond Pond, and then Diamond Pond. The river continues southeast and then east through mountainous and heavily forested terrain, where the chief land use is logging. The river passes through the townships of Dixville and Dix's Grant before joining the Dead Diamond River in the Dartmouth College Grant.

See also

List of rivers of New Hampshire

References

Rivers of New Hampshire
Rivers of Coös County, New Hampshire